Spencer Carriage House and Stable is an historic structure located in the Dupont Circle neighborhood of Washington, D.C.

History
The building is the work of master builder John McGregor and was completed in 1905.  It was built to service the residence of Southern Railway president Samuel Spencer.  The two-story structure features modest brick detailing, a hipped roof, and cupolas.   The building has housed a nightclub and is now a private residence.  It has been listed on the District of Columbia Inventory of Historic Sites since 1995 and it was listed on the National Register of Historic Places in 1996.  It is a contributing property in the Dupont Circle Historic District.

See also
 Codman Carriage House and Stable
 Walsh Stable

References

External links
 

Buildings and structures completed in 1905
Buildings and structures on the National Register of Historic Places in Washington, D.C.
Carriage houses on the National Register of Historic Places
Colonial Revival architecture in Washington, D.C.
Dupont Circle
Stables in the United States